Volumen is a Latin word for "roll" or "volume" and may refer to:

 a book in roll form; see rotulus, scroll and History of scrolls
 Volumen (DVD) by the singer-songwriter Björk
 Volumen Plus, another DVD by Björk
 Volumen 5 by Los Fabulosos Cadillacs, a ska band